The Shetland Experience is a 1977 British short documentary film directed by Derek Williams. It is about environmental measures taken by the oil industry at the Sullom Voe Terminal in Shetland. It was a sponsored film, produced for the environmental advisory group of the Sullom Voe Association, to which the Shetland Islands Council and oil companies belonged. It was nominated for an Academy Award for Best Documentary Short.

References

External links

Watch The Shetland Experience at BP Video Library

1977 films
1977 documentary films
1977 short films
British short documentary films
1970s short documentary films
Documentary films about petroleum
Sponsored films
North Sea energy
Mass media in Shetland
1970s English-language films
1970s British films